"Off He Goes" is a song by the American rock band Pearl Jam. Written by vocalist Eddie Vedder, "Off He Goes" was released in January 1997 as the third single from the band's fourth studio album, No Code (1996). The song peaked at number 31 on the Billboard Alternative Songs chart. The song was included on Pearl Jam's 2004 greatest hits album, rearviewmirror (Greatest Hits 1991–2003).

Origin and recording
"Off He Goes" was written by vocalist Eddie Vedder. Bassist Jeff Ament plays upright bass on the song.

Lyrics
The story of "Off He Goes" concerns a friend who periodically comes whirling in and out of the protagonist's life. In an interview, Vedder revealed himself to be the friend. Vedder said, "The song 'Off He Goes' is really about me being a shit friend. I'll show up and everything's great and then all of [a] sudden I'm outta there..." During a Pearl Jam performance on June 16, 2000 in Katowice, Poland at Spodek, Vedder said before starting the song that "this is about being friends with an asshole," and pointed at himself.

Release and reception
"Off He Goes" was released as a single in 1996 with a previously unreleased B-side titled "Dead Man", which can also be found on the compilation album, Lost Dogs (2003). The song peaked at number 34 on the Billboard Mainstream Rock Tracks chart and number 31 on the Billboard Modern Rock Tracks chart.

Outside the United States, the single was released commercially in Australia. In Canada, the song reached the top 40 on the Canadian Singles Chart, and later it charted on the Canadian Alternative Top 30 chart where it reached number 15 and stayed there for two weeks. "Off He Goes" would peak at number 46 on the Australian Singles Chart.

In AllMusic's review of No Code, "Off He Goes" was cited as one song on the album that is "equal [to] the group's earlier masterpieces." David Fricke of Rolling Stone said, "At first, "Off He Goes" sounds like another page torn from the Neil Young hymnal. Its elegant, acoustic simplicity is deceiving, though. With a humor and confidence that he rarely gets credit for, Vedder describes a man not unlike himself—at least, his public image—but from the point of view of an old, puzzled friend."

Live performances
"Off He Goes" was first performed live at the band's September 14, 1996 concert in Seattle, Washington at The Showbox. In live performance, the song has been especially effective in an acoustic band setting, such as on July 11, 2003 in Mansfield, Massachusetts at the Tweeter Center Boston. Live performances of "Off He Goes" can be found on the live album Live on Two Legs, various official bootlegs, the live album Live at Benaroya Hall, and the Live at the Gorge 05/06 box set. A performance of the song is also included on the DVD Live at the Showbox.

Track listing
All songs written by Eddie Vedder.
"Off He Goes" – 5:59
"Dead Man" – 4:15

Chart positions

References

External links

Lyrics at pearljam.com

1996 singles
Pearl Jam songs
Songs written by Eddie Vedder
Song recordings produced by Eddie Vedder
Song recordings produced by Stone Gossard
Song recordings produced by Jeff Ament
Song recordings produced by Mike McCready
Song recordings produced by Jack Irons
Song recordings produced by Brendan O'Brien (record producer)
Epic Records singles
1996 songs